The inaugural Tees Valley mayoral election was held on 4 May 2017 to elect the mayor of the Tees Valley Combined Authority. The mayor was elected by the supplementary vote system. Subsequent elections will be held in May 2021 and every four years after 2024.

North East England was considered a Labour stronghold and prior to the election, the Labour candidate Sue Jeffrey was considered the overwhelming favourite. The eventual victory of the Conservative candidate Ben Houchen was reported as a shock and a poor result for Labour following their losses in the local elections that same day.

Background
Following a devolution deal between the UK government and the Tees Valley Combined Authority (TVCA), it was agreed to introduce a directly-elected mayor for the combined authority, with an initial election to be held in May 2017. The Cities and Local Government Devolution Act 2016 required a directly-elected metro mayor for combined authorities to receive additional powers from central government.

Candidates

Conservative Party
Ben Houchen, Conservative group leader on Stockton-on-Tees Borough Council.

Labour Party
Sue Jeffrey, Redcar and Cleveland Council leader.

Liberal Democrats
Chris Foote Wood, author and former Bishop Auckland district councillor, was selected to be the Liberal Democrat candidate after defeating Anne-Marie Curry, Liberal Democrat group leader on Darlington Borough Council, in a ballot of party members.

North East Party 
John Tait, former Parliamentary candidate in Stockton North, withdrew from the race after failing to raise the required £5,000 deposit.

UK Independence
John Tennant, UKIP group leader on Hartlepool Borough Council.

Results

Overall

By local authority

Darlington

Hartlepool

Middlesbrough

Redcar and Cleveland

Stockton-on-Tees

References

2017 English local elections
Council elections in North Yorkshire
Mayoral elections in England
May 2017 events in the United Kingdom
2010s in North Yorkshire